Manasi (English: "Mental Images" or "The Mind's Creation") is a 1890 Bengali poetry book written by Rabindranath Tagore.  It comes under the "Manasi-Sonar Tari Group" of Tagore's poetry writings.

Background 
Tagore was also a traveller. He was in Ghazipur when he wrote most of the poems of Manasi. The  natural environment helped Tagore to write the complete rhythmical work. It was his first matured work where he did different types of rhythmical experiments.

List of poems 
The list is in alphabetical order:

 Ananta prem 
 Apekha 
Ahalyar prati
Akankhha
Agantuk
Atmasamarpan
Amar sukh
Ashankha
Ushrinkhal
Ekal o sekal
Ogo bhalo kare bole jao
kobir prati nibedan
Kuhudhani
Khanik milan
Gupta prem
Godhuli
Jibonmadhanye
Tabu

Duranta asha
Desher unnati
Dharmaprachar
Dhyan
Nababangadampattir premalap
Narir ukti
Ninduker prati nibedan
Nivrita ashram
Nisthur sristi
Nisphal kamana
Nisphal prayas
Patra
Patrer pratyasha
Paritykta
Purusher ukti
Purbakale
Prakashbedana
Prakritir prati
Bangabir
Badhu
Barshar dine
Bichhed
Bichheder shanti
Biday
Birahananda
Byekta prem
Bhul-bhanga
Bhule
Bhairavi gaan
Maranswapna
Manasik abhisar
Maya
Meghdoot 
Megher khela
Mouna bhasa

Shunyo hridayer akankhha

Shranti
Shrabaner patra
Sanshayer abeg
Sandhyay
Sindhutaranga
Surdaser prarthana
Hridayer dhan

References

External links 
 মানসী on Bengali Wikisource
 rabindra-rachanabali.nltr.org

1890 poetry books
Bengali poetry collections
Poetry collections by Rabindranath Tagore
Indian poetry books